Study in Consciousness is a book by Annie Besant that was written in ca. 1904.

Besant intended this book to be a contribution to the science of psychology. 

She writes that the seed of consciousness is the tri-atomic Atma-Buddhi-Manas, the Jivatma.

The Super-consciousness includes the whole of the consciousness above the waking-consciousness, like dreams, visions, inspirations, etc. To bring the super-consciousness into manifestation on the physical plane, Besant proposes (in the early stages) to render the brain and sense-organs unresponsive to physical impacts and to induce Trance. This can be done by using the methods of Yogis. But she also says that there is a difference between the super-physical conditions of consciousness in the hypnotised subject and in the Yogi.

See also 

 Association for the Scientific Study of Consciousness

External links 
Goddard College's concentration in Consciousness Studies in Individualized MA Program

Theosophical texts
1907 non-fiction books